The diver insignia (also known as "diver badges") are qualification badges of the uniformed services of the United States which are awarded to servicemen qualified as divers.  Originally, the diver insignia was a cloth patch decoration worn by United States Navy divers in the upper-portion of the enlisted service uniform's left sleeve during the first part of World War II, when the rating insignia was worn on the right sleeve.  When enlisted rating insignia were shifted to the left sleeve in late World War II, the patch shifted to the upper right sleeve.  The diving patch was created during World War II, and became a breast insignia in the late 1960s.

Currently, the United States Navy and the United States Army issue diver insignia and badges denoting degrees of qualification.  The United States Coast Guard and United States Marine Corps personnel are eligible to earn most of the naval diver insignia.

United States naval services

United States naval diver insignias are awarded, per degree of qualification, to sailors, Marines, and Coast Guardsmen. The elementary naval diver insignia is the Scuba Diver Insignia, awarded upon qualifying as a basic naval diver.  Previously, the Scuba Diver Insignia was awarded in two degrees, one for officers and one for enlisted.  The Navy eliminated the Scuba Diver Officer insignia in the 1990s, but it remains in service within the Coast Guard.  The silver-colored insignia features an old-fashioned diving mask and open-circuit breathing apparatus.

In 2001, the Marine Corps authorized the creation of a new badge, the Combatant Diver Insignia, attesting to the wearer's closed-circuit rebreather and reconnaissance combat diver training; the gold-colored combatant diver insignia depicts a wetsuit hood, low-profile diving mask, and chest-mounted rebreather.

The naval deep sea diver qualification insignia are awarded in four degrees: second-class diver; first-class diver; master diver; and diving officer.  However, the Marine Corps does not award the Diving Officer Insignia to its officers.  In the Navy, the master diver is the most qualified diver; he must be a chief petty officer before applying to attend the master diver course.

The Diving Medical Officer Insignia and the Diving Medical Technician Insignia are awarded to naval medical personnel qualified as divers or medical technicians, respectively. The  Diving Medical Insignia resembles the Master Diver Insignia, but is decorated with a caduceus. The Diving Medical Officer Insignia is gold in color while the enlisted version—the Diving Medical Technician Insignia—is silver in color.  Since the Marine Corps and the Coast Guard have no organic medical officers, they do not issue the Diving Medical Officer Insignia.  However, like all medicine, the Marine Corps is served by US Navy Diving Medical Officers and Diving Medical Technicians.  The Diving Medical Officers attend their own training course that often has Air Force, Army, and foreign doctors all who, upon completion, wear the Navy Diving Medical Officer insignia.  The enlisted Diving Medical Technicians attend the same course as Navy divers training to become second-class divers, but with slight changes to the curriculum for medicine.  They enter that class having already trained as Navy hospital corpsmen.

Like the Navy's surface, submarine, and aviation enlisted specialties, dive-qualified enlisted personnel place a term after the sailor's rating; for example, if Petty Officer Second-Class Jones is dive-qualified, he is referred to, in writing, as PO2 (DV) Jones.

The only non-armed service of the United States that awards diver badges is the National Oceanic and Atmospheric Administration Commissioned Corps (NOAA Corps).  NOAA Corps officers qualified as NOAA divers may wear the NOAA Diver Insignia after authorization by the Director of the NOAA Corps.  The NOAA Diver Insignia is a gold-colored pin consisting of a NOAA Corps device surrounded by two dolphins.

United States Army

The United States Army issues two different types of diver badges, one for Army engineer divers and one for Army special operations divers.   Army engineer diver badges are awarded in four degrees (second-class diver, salvage diver, first-class diver, and master diver) while Army special operations diver badges are awarded in two degrees (diver and diving supervisor).  The second-class and first-class diver badges are identical to those issued by U.S. naval forces.  The Army does not issue officer or medical diver badges; however, Navy-awarded Diving Officer Insignia, Diving Medical Officer Insignia, and Diving Medical Technician Insignia are authorized for wear on Army uniforms with written approval from the United States Army Human Resources Command.

On 17 September 2004, the Scuba Diver Insignia/Badge was discontinued in lieu of a new Special Operations Diver Badge and an additional grade, the Special Operations Diving Supervisor Badge, was created.  Prior to this change, the Scuba Diver Insignia/Badge was the same for all of the U.S. armed forces.  The new design includes sharks, symbolizing speed, stealth, and lethal efficiency, and two Fairbairn-Sykes fighting knives in saltire, representing the heritage of OSS operational swimmers during World War II.  The Army Combat Diver Qualification Course and Army Combat Diving Supervisors Course are taught by Company C, 2nd Battalion, 1st Special Warfare Training Group at the Special Forces Underwater Operations School, Naval Air Station Key West.

United States Air Force

The United States Air Force issues the Scuba Badge to graduates of the Air Force Combat Dive Course at the Navy Diving Salvage and Training Center, Naval Support Activity Panama City. The badge is identical in appearance to the current Navy services scuba insignia but with a mirror finish, and is the same diver insignia that was once awarded to all Army special operations divers until the Army updated its badge in 2004.

Until the establishment of the US Air Force Combat Dive Course in 2006, special operations Airmen attended either the U.S. Army Combat Diver Qualification Course or the U.S. Marine Corps Combatant Diver Course.  Badges awarded from sister-service combat diver courses, as well as other U.S. Navy dive courses (basic Scuba, Diving Medical Officer, etc.) are authorized for wear on U.S. Air Force uniforms.

In October 2022 the United States Air Force approved a new Air Force specific Scuba Badge for graduates of the Air Force Combat Dive Course.

See also

References

United States military badges
Diving qualifications
Armed forces diving